"I Don't Dance" is a song co-written and recorded by American country music artist Lee Brice. It was released on February 18, 2014 as the first single and title track from Brice's third studio album of the same name. Brice co-wrote the song with Rob Hatch and Dallas Davidson.

Content
The song is set in the key of C-sharp major with a vocal range of G-G and a main chord pattern of C-F-G-C.

Critical reception
The song received a favorable review from Taste of Country, which called it "personal, like almost every song on the Hard 2 Love album, but also powerful and experimental like Brice’s early recordings." The reviewer added that "it’s the thump of a deep drum — perhaps a tympani — and loud cry of the pedal steel that provide the song’s signature and any emotional reaction that comes while listening." Matt Bjorke of Roughstock gave the song four stars out of five, writing that "the production and melody behind the lyrics is mid-tempo and right in the core pocket of what Lee Brice does best." Bjorke called it "a strong single choice and a song that should be the beginnings of a successful upcoming album."

Music video
The music video was directed by Ryan Smith and premiered in April 2014.

Commercial performance
"I Don't Dance" debuted at number 59 on the U.S. Billboard Country Airplay chart for the week of February 22, 2014. It also debuted at number 24 on the U.S. Billboard Hot Country Songs chart for the week of March 15, 2014.  It also debuted at number 89 on the U.S. Billboard Hot 100 chart for the week of May 3, 2014. The song was certified Platinum on September 2, 2014, and reached over a million copies sold on September 24, 2014. As of April 2015, the song has sold 1,303,000 copies in the US. On February 3, 2017, the song received a double platinum status by the RIAA.

Charts and certifications

Weekly charts

Year-end charts

Certifications

References

2014 songs
2014 singles
Lee Brice songs
Curb Records singles
Songs written by Lee Brice
Songs written by Rob Hatch
Songs written by Dallas Davidson
Country ballads
Songs about dancing